was a Japanese princess, born a daughter of Emperor Kōnin.

Her mother was reported to be Princess Inoue—a daughter of Emperor Shōmu, but there is another theory that her mother was Takano no Niigasa.

After his father was enthroned as the emperor of Japan, Princess Sakahito became the 21st Saiō of the Ise Grand Shrine in 772, while Princess Inoue and Prince Osabe—a son of Princess Inoue and a younger brother of Princess Sakahito—were confined in 773.

After the deaths of Princess Inoue and Prince Osabe in 775, Princess Sakahito married her elder half-brother Prince Yamabe, whose mother was Takano no Niigasa. Prince Yamabe later became Emperor Kammu. A record claims that Emperor Kōnin attempted to make her the empress regnant but failed.

Emperor Kammu and Princess Sakahito had a daughter, Princess Asahara, but Princess Asahara died in 817 before Princess Sakahito's death in 829.

References

Japanese princesses
People of Heian-period Japan
People of Nara-period Japan
Emperor Kanmu
Saigū
Daughters of emperors